El Cartel may refer to:

Film and television
El Cartel de los Sapos (film) (The Snitch Cartel), a 2011 Colombian crime film
El Cartel (TV series), a 2008 Colombian TV series

Music
 El Cartel Records, record label

Albums
 El Cartel (album), a 1997 compilation album featuring Daddy Yankee
 El Cartel II, a 2001 compilation album by Daddy Yankee
 El Cartel: The Big Boss, a 2007 album by Daddy Yankee

See also 
 Cartel (disambiguation)